Museo ng Muntinlupa also known as the Muntinlupa Museum is a history city museum in Centennial Avenue, Tunasan, Muntinlupa, Metro Manila, Philippines.

Construction
It was initially projected to be finished within a year in time for the centennial celebration of Muntinlupa on December 19 but was completed within almost two years. It was opened to the public on March 1, 2019 coinciding with Muntinlupa's 24th founding anniversary as a city.

Architecture
The museum standing on a  land was designed by Beaudon Causapin, the City Architect of Muntinlupa. The building's facade was designed based on the salakab, a traditional fishing trap made from weaved bamboo sticks and fasted by rattan rope often used by fishers working in Laguna de Bay, as a tribute to Muntinlupa's fishing industry which is a major part of the city's economy. The Museo ng Muntinlupa stands five storeys high. The ochre columns and wire netting of the buildings were devised to manage the building's temperature by absorbing and deflecting heat.

Facilities
The Museum host a main gallery, a mayor's hall, an interactive science center, and a theater with 200 people seating capacity. It features exhibits featuring the city's history from the precolonial era until the modern period. It also features works of the city's contemporary artists as well as temporary exhibitions.

References

2019 establishments in the Philippines
Museums established in 2019
History museums in the Philippines
City museums in the Philippines
Museums in Metro Manila
Buildings and structures in Muntinlupa